Archbishop Dominic Lumon is the Roman Catholic Archbishop of Imphal.

Early life 
Lumon was born on 1 June 1948 in Imphal, Manipur, India.

Priesthood 
Lumon was Ordained a Catholic Priest on 8 February 1977.

Episcopate 
Bishop Lumon was created Coadjutor archbishop of Imphal on 18 January 2002 and consecrated a bishop by Archbishop Joseph Mittathany on 7 April 2002. He succeeded as the metropolitan archbishop on 12 July 2006.

References

Living people
21st-century Roman Catholic archbishops in India
People from Manipur
1948 births